Family Values is a crime novel by the American writer K. C. Constantine set in 1990s Rocksburg, a fictional, blue-collar, Rust Belt town in Western Pennsylvania, modeled on the author's hometown of McKees Rocks, Pennsylvania, adjacent to Pittsburgh.

Mario Balzic is the protagonist, an atypical detective for the genre, a Serbo-Italian American cop, unpretentious, a family man who asks questions and uses more sense than force.

The novel opens with Balzic being lured out of his retirement with an offer: investigate a 17-year-old murder that just gets stranger as time passes in exchange for the title of Special Investigator, state credentials, and thirty-five dollars an hour.

It is the thirteenth book in the 17-volume Rocksburg series.

References 
https://www.fantasticfiction.com, w. (2019). K C Constantine. [online] Fantasticfiction.com. Available at: https://www.fantasticfiction.com/c/k-c-constantine/ [Accessed 14 Apr. 2019].

Good Sons by K.C. Constantine. (1996, February 1). Retrieved from https://www.goodreads.com/book/show/2176688.Good_Sons

1997 American novels
Novels by K. C. Constantine
American crime novels
Novels set in Pennsylvania
Mysterious Press books